Experientialism is a philosophical view which states that there is no "purely rational" detached God's-eye view of the world which is external to human thought. It was first developed by George Lakoff and Mark Johnson in Metaphors We Live By. Experientialism is especially a response to the objectivist tradition of transcendental truth most prominently formulated by Immanuel Kant which still requires a commitment to what Lakoff and Johnson call "basic realism". Most importantly, this involves acknowledging the existence of a mind-independent external world and the possibility of stable knowledge of that external world. In Women, Fire and Dangerous Things, Lakoff expands on the foundations of experientialism with research into the nature of categories.

References

Further reading

 George Lakoff and Mark Turner (1989). More Than Cool Reason: A Field Guide to Poetic Metaphor. University of Chicago Press.
 George Lakoff and Mark Johnson (1999). Philosophy In The Flesh: the Embodied Mind and its Challenge to Western Thought. Basic Books.
 George Lakoff and Rafael Núñez (2000). Where Mathematics Comes From: How the Embodied Mind Brings Mathematics into Being. Basic Books. .
 Verena Haser (2005). Metaphor, Metonymy, and Experientialist Philosophy: Challenging Cognitive Semantics. Walter de Gruyter. books.google.com

Epistemological theories